Highly Publicized Digital Boxing Match is the second album by Afuche, a band founded in Brooklyn in 2008. The album was released on May 31, 2011. It has been called the most innovative album of 2011, specifically by WVAU.org.

Reception

Track listing
Monster Smith
Who're They
They're in There
Danice Marino
Here's to Here's to Toast
Here's to Toast
Initialeone
Gulf 
Pablo Leon
Muscovy
TH Sq'd

Personnel
Ruben Sindo Acosta – keyboard, vocals, percussion
Zach Ryalls – guitar
Denny Tek – bass
Andrew Carrico – baritone sax
Max Jaffe – drums

References

Cuneiform Records albums
2011 albums